On 28 April 2022, at least 11 people were killed and 13 others injured by a double bombing in Mazar-i-Sharif in Balkh Province, Afghanistan.

See also 
Terrorist incidents in Afghanistan in 2022

References

2022 murders in Afghanistan
21st century in Balkh Province
21st-century mass murder in Afghanistan
April 2022 crimes in Asia
April 2022 events in Afghanistan
Crime in Balkh Province
Improvised explosive device bombings in 2022
Improvised explosive device bombings in Afghanistan
Mass murder in 2022
28 April 2022 bombing
Terrorist incidents in Afghanistan in 2022